The Columbia Lions men's soccer team is an intercollegiate varsity sports team of Columbia University. The team is a member of the Ivy League of the National Collegiate Athletic Association.

The Lions fielded their first varsity team in 1906, and have since won 10 Ivy League Championships and have made 14 NCAA tournament appearances.
Their most recent appearance in the NCAA Division I Men's Soccer Championship came in 2017 where the Lions reached the second round before losing 1–0 to Wake Forest in the 88' on a penalty kick.

Since 2009, the Lions have been coached by Kevin Anderson, a former assistant coach for the Boston College Eagles men's soccer program. Anderson played soccer professionally for ten years with the Colorado Rapids and the Tampa Bay Mutiny of Major League Soccer.

Roster

Team honors

Conference championships 
Columbia has won 10 Ivy League championships, 
their last being in the 2016–2017 season.

Kit history
First kits

Secondary kits

References

External links
 

 
1906 establishments in New York City
Association football clubs established in 1906